Acraga is a genus of moths of the family Dalceridae.

Species
Acraga goes group:
 Acraga goes Schaus, 1910
 Acraga ingenescens (Dyar, 1927)
 Acraga luteola (Hopp, 1921)
Acraga hamata group:
 Acraga hamata Schaus, 1910
 Acraga andina S.E. Miller, 1994
Acraga flava group:
 Acraga flava (Walker, 1855)
 Acraga obscura (Schaus, 1896)
Acraga infusa group:
 Acraga infusa Schaus, 1905
 Acraga conda Dyar, 1911
 Acraga philetera (Schaus, 1910)
 Acraga ria (Dyar, 1910)
 Acraga neblina S.E. Miller, 1994
 Acraga serrata S.E. Miller, 1994
Acraga ciliata group:
 Acraga ciliata Walker, 1855
 Acraga moorei Dyar, 1898
 Acraga coa (Schaus, 1892)
 Acraga chicana S.E. Miller, 1994
Acraga concolor group:
 Acraga concolor (Walker, 1865)
 Acraga citrinopsis (Dyar, 1927)
 Acraga beebei S.E. Miller, 1994
Acraga melinda group:
 Acraga melinda (Druce, 1898)
 Acraga amazonica S.E. Miller, 1994
 Acraga meridensis Dognin, 1907
 Acraga mariala Dognin, 1923
 Acraga perbrunnea Dyar, 1927
Acraga citrina group:
 Acraga citrina (Schaus, 1896)
 Acraga hoppiana S.E. Miller, 1994
Acraga ferruginea group:
 Acraga ferruginea Hopp, 1922
 Acraga brunnea S.E. Miller, 1994
Acraga ampela group:
 Acraga ampela (Druce, 1890)
 Acraga puno S.E. Miller, 1994
 Acraga boliviana Hopp, 1921
 Acraga angulifera Schaus, 1905
 Acraga isothea Dognin, 1914
 Acraga leberna (Druce, 1890)
 Acraga umbrifera (Schaus, 1905)
Acraga ochracea group:
 Acraga ochracea (Walker, 1855)
 Acraga victoria S.E. Miller, 1994
 Acraga sexquicentenaria (Orfila, 1961)
 Acraga parana S.E. Miller, 1994

Former species
 Acraga albescens Hopp, 1929
 Acraga arcifera Dyar, 1910
 Acraga canaquitam Dyar, 1925
 Acraga caretta Dyar, 1910
 Acraga cosmia Dognin, 1911
 Acraga dulciola Dyar, 1914
 Acraga gugelmanni Dyar, 1916
 Acraga mesoa Druce, 1887
 Acraga moribunda Schaus, 1920
 Acraga nana Dognin, 1920
 Acraga phasma Dyar, 1927
 Acraga rebella Schaus, 1911
 Acraga sofia Dyar, 1910
 Acraga sororcula Dyar, 1927

References

 , 1994: Systematics of the Neotropical moth family Dalceridae (Lepidoptera). Bulletin of the Museum of Comparative Zoology 153(4): 1-495. Full Article: 

Dalceridae
Zygaenoidea genera